The South African National Defence Force follows the British Army system of awarding battle honours to military units, to recognize the battles and campaigns in which they have fought with distinction. The following is a list of battle honours with descriptions and listing the units for each battle honour:

Battle Honours of South Africa

South West Africa 1915 
 Name: South West Africa 1915

 Southern Rifles
 Southern Rifles
 Cape Town Highlanders, The Duke of Connaught and Strathearn's Own
 Cape Garrison Artillery
 Cape Field Artillery

South West Africa 1914–1915
South West Africa 1914–1915 for the South West Africa campaign

 Description: 
 Witwatersrand Rifles Regiment
 Western Province Mounted Rifles
 Umvoti Mounted Rifles
 Transvaal Scottish Regiment
 Transvaal Horse Artillery
 South African Heavy Artillery
 SA MR Field Artillery
 S.A. Police (1913–1994)
 S.A. Mounted Rifles
 South African Irish Regiment
 Royal Natal Carbineers
 Royal Durban Light Infantry
 Rand Rifles
 Rand Light Infantry
 Pretoria Regiment
 Potchefstroom Ruiters
 Noordelike Transvaal Berede Skutters
 Natal Mounted Rifles
 Natal Field Artillery
 Midlandse Skutters
 Midlandse Ruiters
 Kimberley Volunteer Regiment
 Kaffrarian Rifle Volunteers
 Imperial Light Horse
 Hartigan's Horse
 Griqualand West Ruiters
 Graaf-Reinet Ruiters
 First City Volunteers of Grahamstown
 Field Ambulance, 1st
 Cape Town Rifles
 Brand's O.V.S. Schutters
 Bechuanaland Rifles, 9th Dismounted Rifles
 Bechuanaland Rifles

Bechuanaland 1896–97 
 Name: Bechuanaland 1896–97

 Description: Cape military and police operations against the Batswana ("Bechuana") from December 1896 to August 1897. Most of the fighting took place in the Langberg mountains. The battle honour was: Bechuanaland 1896–97 (or 1897) Burgher force units which took part were granted their own honours in 1938: Betsjoeanaland 1896 ? Langberg 1897.
 Kimberley Volunteer Regiment
 Cape Town Highlanders, The Duke of Connaught and Strathearn's Own

South Africa 1899–1902 
 Name: South Africa 1899–1902

 Description: From October 1899 until May 1902, British, Cape and Natal forces fought the neighbouring Boer republics, which eventually capitulated. Battle honours were authorised by the British government
 Umvoti Mounted Rifles
 Uitenhage Volunteer Rifles
 Transkei Mounted Rifles
 Royal Natal Carbineers
 Royal Durban Light Infantry
 Queenstown Rifle Volunteers
 Prince Alfred's Own Volunteer Guards
 Natal Royal Regiment
 Natal Mounted Rifles
 Kimberley Volunteer Regiment
 Kaffrarian Rifle Volunteers
 Imperial Light Horse
 First City Volunteers of Grahamstown
 Cape Town Rifles
 Cape Town Highlanders, The Duke of Connaught and Strathearn's Own
 Border Mounted Rifles

Western Desert 1941–43 
 Name: Western Desert 1941–43

 Description: 
 Umvoti Mounted Rifles
 Transvaal Scottish Regiment
 S.A. Police (1913–1994)
 South African Irish Regiment
 Royal Natal Carbineers
 Royal Durban Light Infantry
 Regiment Vrystaat
 Regiment Groot Karoo
 Regiment Christiaan Beyers
 Rand Light Infantry
 Regiment President Steyn
 Natal Mounted Rifles
 Kaffrarian Rifle Volunteers
 Imperial Light Horse
 Cape Town Rifles
 Cape Town Highlanders, The Duke of Connaught and Strathearn's Own

Gazala 

 Name: Gazala from the Battle of Gazala

 Description: The Battle of Gazala (near the village of ) was fought during the Western Desert Campaign of the Second World War, west of the port of Tobruk in Libya, from 26 May to 21 June 1942.
 Transvaal Scottish Regiment
 S.A. Police (1913–1994)
 Royal Natal Carbineers
 Royal Durban Light Infantry
 Regiment Vrystaat
 Regiment Groot Karoo
 Regiment Christiaan Beyers
 Rand Light Infantry
 Regiment President Steyn
 Natal Mounted Rifles
 Imperial Light Horse
 Cape Town Rifles
 Cape Town Highlanders, The Duke of Connaught and Strathearn's Own

Alem Hamza 
 Name: Alem Hamza

 Description: 
 Transvaal Scottish Regiment
 Cape Town Highlanders, The Duke of Connaught and Strathearn's Own

Best Post 

 Name: Best Post
 Description: 
 Natal Mounted Rifles
 Cape Town Highlanders, The Duke of Connaught and Strathearn's Own

Alamein Defence 

 Name: Alamein Defence for the First Battle of El Alamein
 Description: 
 Transvaal Scottish Regiment
 Royal Natal Carbineers
 Royal Durban Light Infantry
 Regiment Vrystaat
 Regiment Groot Karoo
 Regiment Christiaan Beyers
 Rand Light Infantry
 Regiment President Steyn
 Natal Mounted Rifles
 Imperial Light Horse
 Cape Town Rifles
 Cape Town Highlanders, The Duke of Connaught and Strathearn's Own

Alamein Box 

 Name: Alamein Box
 Description: 
 Royal Durban Light Infantry
 Imperial Light Horse
 Cape Town Highlanders, The Duke of Connaught and Strathearn's Own

El Alamein 

 Name: El Alamein
 Description: The First Battle of El Alamein (1–27 July 1942) was a battle of the Western Desert Campaign of the Second World War, fought in Egypt between Axis forces (Germany and Italy) of the Panzer Army Africa (Panzerarmee Afrika) (which included the Afrika Korps under Field Marshal (Generalfeldmarschall) Erwin Rommel) and Allied (British Imperial and Commonwealth) forces (United Kingdom, British India, Australia, South Africa and New Zealand) of the Eighth Army (under General Claude Auchinleck).
 Transvaal Scottish Regiment
 Royal Natal Carbineers
 Royal Durban Light Infantry
 Regiment Vrystaat
 Regiment Groot Karoo
 Regiment Christiaan Beyers
 Rand Light Infantry
 Regiment President Steyn
 Natal Mounted Rifles
 Imperial Light Horse
 Cape Town Rifles
 Cape Town Highlanders, The Duke of Connaught and Strathearn's Own

Italy 1944–45 

 Name: Italy 1944–45
 Description: 
 Witwatersrand Rifles Regiment
 Special Service Battalion
 Royal Natal Carbineers
 Royal Durban Light Infantry
 Prince Alfred's Own Volunteer Guards
 Pretoria Regiment
 Natal Mounted Rifles
 Kimberley Volunteer Regiment
 Imperial Light Horse
 First City Volunteers of Grahamstown
 Regiment de la Rey
 Cape Town Highlanders, The Duke of Connaught and Strathearn's Own

Casino II 

 Name: Casino II
 Description: 
 Witwatersrand Rifles Regiment
 Royal Natal Carbineers
 Royal Durban Light Infantry
 Kimberley Volunteer Regiment
 Imperial Light Horse
 First City Volunteers of Grahamstown
 Regiment de la Rey
 Cape Town Highlanders, The Duke of Connaught and Strathearn's Own

Chiusi 

 Name: Chiusi
 Description: 
 First City Volunteers of Grahamstown
 Cape Town Highlanders, The Duke of Connaught and Strathearn's Own

Florence 

 Name: Florence
 Description: 
 Witwatersrand Rifles Regiment
 Special Service Battalion
 Royal Natal Carbineers
 Royal Durban Light Infantry
 Prince Alfred's Own Volunteer Guards
 Pretoria Regiment
 Natal Mounted Rifles
 Kimberley Volunteer Regiment
 Imperial Light Horse
 First City Volunteers of Grahamstown
 Regiment de la Rey
 Cape Town Highlanders, The Duke of Connaught and Strathearn's Own

The Greve 

 Name: The Greve
 Description: 
 Witwatersrand Rifles Regiment
 Special Service Battalion
 Royal Natal Carbineers
 Prince Alfred's Own Volunteer Guards
 Natal Mounted Rifles
 Kimberley Volunteer Regiment
 Imperial Light Horse
 First City Volunteers of Grahamstown
 Regiment de la Rey
 Cape Town Highlanders, The Duke of Connaught and Strathearn's Own

Gothic Line 

 Name: Gothic Line
 Description: 
 Witwatersrand Rifles Regiment
 Special Service Battalion
 Royal Natal Carbineers
 Royal Durban Light Infantry
 Prince Alfred's Own Volunteer Guards
 Pretoria Regiment
 Natal Mounted Rifles
 Kimberley Volunteer Regiment
 Imperial Light Horse
 Imperial Light Horse
 First City Volunteers of Grahamstown
 Regiment de la Rey
 Cape Town Highlanders, The Duke of Connaught and Strathearn's Own

Monte Stanco 

 Name: Monte Stanco
 Description:
 Witwatersrand Rifles Regiment
 Royal Natal Carbineers
 Royal Durban Light Infantry
 First City Volunteers of Grahamstown
 Regiment de la Rey
 Cape Town Highlanders, The Duke of Connaught and Strathearn's Own

Monte Pezza 

 Name: Monte Pezza
 Description:
 Royal Natal Carbineers
 Royal Durban Light Infantry
 First City Volunteers of Grahamstown
 Cape Town Highlanders, The Duke of Connaught and Strathearn's Own

Sole/Caprara 

 Name: Sole/Caprara
 Description: 
 Witwatersrand Rifles Regiment
 Royal Durban Light Infantry
 First City Volunteers of Grahamstown
 Regiment de la Rey
 Cape Town Highlanders, The Duke of Connaught and Strathearn's Own

Po Valley 

 Name: Po Valley
 Description: 
 Witwatersrand Rifles Regiment
 Special Service Battalion
 Royal Natal Carbineers
 Royal Durban Light Infantry
 Prince Alfred's Own Volunteer Guards
 Pretoria Regiment
 Natal Mounted Rifles
 Kimberley Volunteer Regiment
 Imperial Light Horse
 First City Volunteers of Grahamstown
 Regiment de la Rey
 Cape Town Highlanders, The Duke of Connaught and Strathearn's Own

Gaika Gcaleka 1877 

 Name: Gaika Gcaleka 1877
 Description: Operations by British and Cape Colony forces against the Ngqika ("Gaika") and Gcaleka nations on the colony's eastern frontier, from September 1877 to June 1878.
 Prince Alfred's Own Volunteer Guards
 Kimberley Volunteer Regiment
 Kaffrarian Rifle Volunteers
 First City Volunteers of Grahamstown
 Cape Town Rifles

Transkei 1879 

 Name: Transkei 1879
A Cape unit, which was stationed in the Transkei to release a British regiment for active service, has this, its own honour for this period
 Cape Town Rifles

Basutoland 1880–81 

 Name: Basutoland 1880–81
A campaign, conducted against the Basotho in Basutoland (now Lesotho) from September 1880 to June 1881. The Cape transferred the Basutoland protectorate to Britain in 1884. Burgher force ("commando") units which served in this campaign were granted separate honours in 1938
 Prince Alfred's Own Volunteer Guards
 Kimberley Volunteer Regiment
 First City Volunteers of Grahamstown
 Cape Town Rifles

Bechuanaland 1897 

 Name: Bechuanaland 1897
 Description: 
 Prince Alfred's Own Volunteer Guards
 Kaffrarian Rifle Volunteers
 First City Volunteers of Grahamstown
 Cape Town Rifles

East Africa 1940–41 

 Name: East Africa 1940–41
 Description: 
 South African Irish Regiment
 Royal Natal Carbineers
 Regiment Vrystaat
 Regiment Christiaan Beyers
 Regiment President Steyn
 Natal Mounted Rifles
 Cape Town Rifles

El Wak 

 Name: El Wak
 Description: 
 Transvaal Scottish Regiment
 Royal Natal Carbineers
 Cape Town Rifles

The Juba 

 Name: The Juba
 Description: 
 Transvaal Scottish Regiment
 Royal Natal Carbineers
 Cape Town Rifles

Combolcia 

 Name: Combolcia
 Description: 
 Transvaal Scottish Regiment
 Royal Natal Carbineers
 Cape Town Rifles

Amba Alagi 

 Name: Amba Alagi
 Description: 
 Transvaal Scottish Regiment
 Royal Natal Carbineers
 Cape Town Rifles

Sidi Rezegh 

 Name: Sidi Rezegh
 Description: 
 Transvaal Scottish Regiment
 South African Irish Regiment
 Royal Natal Carbineers
 Regiment Vrystaat
 Regiment Christiaan Beyers
 Regiment President Steyn
 Cape Town Rifles

South Africa 1879 

 Name: South Africa 1879
 Description: British and Natal forces invaded Zululand in January 1879 and conquered it after a hard 6-month campaign. The Natal government authorised a battle honour in 1909.
 Umvoti Mounted Rifles
 Royal Natal Carbineers
 Royal Durban Light Infantry
 Natal Mounted Rifles
 Border Mounted Rifles

Relief of Ladysmith 

 Name: Relief of Ladysmith
 Description: From October 1899 until May 1902, British, Cape and Natal forces fought the neighbouring Boer republics, which eventually capitulated. Battle honours were authorised by the British government
 Umvoti Mounted Rifles
 Royal Durban Light Infantry
 Natal Royal Regiment
 Imperial Light Horse

Natal 1906 

 Name: Natal 1906
 Description: Natal operations (with Transvaal support) against the Zulu and Zondi between February and August 1906. The Natal government authorised a battle honour in 1908
 Zululand Mounted Rifles
 Umvoti Mounted Rifles
 Royal Natal Carbineers
 Royal Durban Light Infantry
 Northern Districts Mounted Rifles
 Natal Royal Regiment
 Natal Mounted Rifles
 Imperial Light Horse
 Border Mounted Rifles

Bardia 

 Name: Bardia
 Description: 
 S.A. Police (1913–1994)
 Royal Durban Light Infantry
 Regiment Groot Karoo
 Rand Light Infantry
 Kaffrarian Rifle Volunteers
 Imperial Light Horse

Point 204 

 Name: Point 204
 Description: 
 S.A. Police (1913–1994)
 Royal Natal Carbineers

Madagascar 1942 

 Name: Madagascar 1942
 Description: 
 First City Volunteers of Grahamstown

Griqualand West 1878 

 Name: Griqualand West 1878
 Description: A campaign by Cape Colony forces against the Koranna on the colony's northern border (the Orange River) in 1878.
 Kimberley Volunteer Regiment

Transkei 1880–81 

 Name: Transkei 1880–81
 Description: One of two concurrent campaigns by Cape Colony forces against African subjects who resisted a government police outlawing ownership of firearms. This was conducted against the Xhosa in the Transkei from October 1880 until April 1881.
 Kimberley Volunteer Regiment

Defence of Kimberley 

 Name: Defence of Kimberley
 Description: From October 1899 until May 1902, British, Cape and Natal forces fought the neighbouring Boer republics, which eventually capitulated. Battle honours were authorised by the British government
 Kimberley Volunteer Regiment

Celleno 

 Name: Celleno
 Special Service Battalion
 Prince Alfred's Own Volunteer Guards
 Natal Mounted Rifles
 Kimberley Volunteer Regiment
 Imperial Light Horse

Monte Porro del Bagno 

 Name: Monte Porro del Bagno
 Kimberley Volunteer Regiment
 Imperial Light Horse

Monte Vigese 

 Name: Monte Vigese
 Royal Natal Carbineers
 Kimberley Volunteer Regiment
 Imperial Light Horse

Monte Salvaro 

 Name: Monte Salvaro
 Witwatersrand Rifles Regiment
 Kimberley Volunteer Regiment
 Imperial Light Horse
 Regiment de la Rey

Defence of Ladysmith 

 Name: Defence of Ladysmith
 Description: From October 1899 until May 1902, British, Cape and Natal forces fought the neighbouring Boer republics, which eventually capitulated. Battle honours were authorised by the British government
 Royal Natal Carbineers
 Natal Mounted Rifles
 Imperial Light Horse
 Border Mounted Rifles

Gibeon 

 Name: Gibeon
 Umvoti Mounted Rifles
 Royal Natal Carbineers
 Natal Mounted Rifles
 Natal Mounted Rifles
 Imperial Light Horse

Mersa Belafarit 

 Name: Mersa Belafarit
 Imperial Light Horse

Dadaba 

 Name: Dadaba
 Natal Mounted Rifles

Best Post 

 Name: Best Post

The Tiber 

 Name: The Tiber
 Natal Mounted Rifles

Madagascar 

 Name: Madagascar
 Pretoria Regiment
 Pretoria Highlanders

Bagno Regio 

 Name: Bagno Regio
 Pretoria Regiment

Sarteano 

 Name: Sarteano
 Pretoria Regiment

La Foce 

 Name: La Foce
 Pretoria Regiment

Catarelto Ridge 

 Name: Catarelto Ridge
 Pretoria Regiment

Transkei 1877–78 

 Name: Transkei 1877–78
 Description: Operations by British and Cape Colony forces against the Ngqika ("Gaika") and Gcaleka nations on the colony's eastern frontier, from September 1877 to June 1878.
 Prince Alfred's Own Volunteer Guards

Umzintzani 

 Name: Umzintzani
 Description: Operations by British and Cape Colony forces against the Ngqika ("Gaika") and Gcaleka nations on the colony's eastern frontier, from September 1877 to June 1878.
 Prince Alfred's Own Volunteer Guards

Allerona 

 Name:Allerona
 Witwatersrand Rifles Regiment
 Regiment de la Rey

Monte Querciabella 

 Name: Monte Querciabella
 Witwatersrand Rifles Regiment
 Regiment de la Rey

Monte Fili 

 Name:Monte Fili
 Witwatersrand Rifles Regiment
 Regiment de la Rey

Campo Santo Bridge 

 Name: Campo Santo Bridge
 Witwatersrand Rifles Regiment
 Regiment de la Rey

Kilimanjaro 

 Name: Kilimanjaro
 South African Infantry Regiment, 9th (9 SAI)
 South African Infantry Regiment, 8th (8 SAI)
 South African Infantry Regiment, 7th (7 SAI)
 South African Infantry Regiment, 6th (6 SAI)
 South African Infantry Regiment, 5th (5 SAI)
 South African Infantry Regiment, 11th (11 SAI)
 South African Infantry Regiment, 10th (10 SAI)
 South African Cape Corps Service Battalion
 SA Horse, 3rd (3rd SAH)
 SA Field Ambulance, 5th
 SA Field Ambulance, 4th
 SA Field Ambulance, 3rd
 SA Field Ambulance, 2nd
 SA Field Ambulance, 1st
 Cape Corps

Behobeho 

 Name: Behobeho
 South African Infantry Regiment, 7th (7 SAI)
 South African Infantry Regiment, 6th (6 SAI)
 South African Cape Corps Service Battalion
 Cape Corps

Nyangao 

 Name: Nyangao
 South African Infantry Regiment, 8th (8 SAI)
 South African Infantry Regiment, 7th (7 SAI)
 South African Cape Corps Service Battalion
 SA Horse, 10th (10th SAH)
 Cape Corps

East Africa 1916–17 

 Name: East Africa 1916–17
 Cape Corps

East Africa 1917–18 

 Name: East Africa 1917–18
 Cape Corps

East Africa 1916–18 

 Name: East Africa 1916–18
 Transvaal Scottish Regiment
 South African Infantry Regiment, 9th (9 SAI)
 South African Infantry Regiment, 8th (8 SAI)
 South African Infantry Regiment, 7th (7 SAI)
 South African Infantry Regiment, 6th (6 SAI)
 South African Infantry Regiment, 5th (5 SAI)
 South African Infantry Regiment, 11th (11 SAI)
 South African Infantry Regiment, 10th (10 SAI)
 South African Cape Corps Service Battalion
 SA Horse, 9th (9th SAH)
 SA Horse, 8th (8th SAH)
 SA Horse, 4th (4th SAH)
 SA Horse, 3rd (3rd SAH)
 SA Horse, 10th (10th SAH)
 SA Field Ambulance, 5th
 SA Field Ambulance, 4th
 SA Field Ambulance, 3rd
 SA Field Ambulance, 2nd
 SA Field Ambulance, 1st
 S.A. Rifles
 Cape Corps

Megiddo 

 Name: Megiddo
 South African Cape Corps Service Battalion
 Cape Corps

Cape of Good Hope 

 Name: Cape of Good Hope
 Cape Corps

Nablus 

 Name: Nablus
 South African Cape Corps Service Battalion
 Cape Corps

Palestine 1918 

 Name: Palestine 1918
 South African Cape Corps Service Battalion
 SA Field Ambulance, 5th
 SA Field Ambulance, 4th
 SA Field Ambulance, 3rd
 SA Field Ambulance, 2nd
 SA Field Ambulance, 1st
 Cape Corps

Mega 

 Name: Mega
 Transvaal Scottish Regiment
 South African Irish Regiment

Yonte 

 Name: Yonte
 Transvaal Scottish Regiment

Diredawa 

 Name: Diredawa
 Transvaal Scottish Regiment

Sollum 

 Name: Sollum
 Transvaal Scottish Regiment
 S.A. Police (1913–1994)

Alem Hamza 

 Name: Alem Hamza
 Cape Town Rifles

Acroma Keep 

 Name: Acroma Keep
 Transvaal Scottish Regiment

Egypt 1916 

 Name: Egypt 1916
 South African Field Ambulance, 1st

Somme 1916 

 Name: Somme 1916
 South African Field Ambulance, 1st

Delville Wood

 Name: Delville Wood
 South African Field Ambulance, 1st

Arras 

 Name: Arras
 South African Field Ambulance, 1st

Scarpe 1917 

 Name: Scarpe 1917
 South African Field Ambulance, 1st

Ypres 1917 

 Name: Ypres 1917
 South African Field Ambulance, 1st

Menin Road 

 Name: Menin Road
 South African Field Ambulance, 1st

Selle 

 Name: Selle
 South African Field Ambulance, 1st

Sambre 

 Name: Sambre

 South African Field Ambulance, 1st

France and Flanders 1916–18 

 Name: France and Flanders 1916–18
 South African Field Ambulance, 1st

El Mughar 

 Name: El Mughar
 SA Field Ambulance, 4th
 SA Field Ambulance, 2nd
 SA Field Ambulance, 1st

Nebi Samwil 

 Name: Nebi Samwil
 SA Field Ambulance, 4th
 SA Field Ambulance, 2nd
 SA Field Ambulance, 1st

Tel Asur 

 Name: Tel Asur
 SA Field Ambulance, 5th
 SA Field Ambulance, 4th
 SA Field Ambulance, 3rd
 SA Field Ambulance, 2nd
 SA Field Ambulance, 1st

Sharon 

 Name: Sharon
 SA Field Ambulance, 5th
 SA Field Ambulance, 4th
 SA Field Ambulance, 3rd
 SA Field Ambulance, 2nd
 SA Field Ambulance, 1st

Narungombe 

 Narungombe
 South African Infantry Regiment, 8th (8 SAI)
 South African Infantry Regiment, 7th (7 SAI)

German East Africa 1916–18 

 Name: German East Africa 1916–18
 S.A. Police (1913–1994)

Halfaya 

 Name: Halfaya
 S.A. Police (1913–1994)

Commonwealth Keep 

 Name: Commonwealth Keep
 S.A. Police (1913–1994)

Tobruk 

 Name: Tobruk
 S.A. Police (1913–1994)

Kunene

 Name: Kunene
 Special Service Battalion

South West Africa/Angola 1975–1976

 Name: South West Africa/Angola 1975–1976
 Special Service Battalion
 Kaffrarian Rifle Volunteers

South West Africa/Angola 1976–1989 

 Name: South West Africa/Angola 1976–1989
 Special Service Battalion
 Kaffrarian Rifle Volunteers
 61 Mechanised Infantry Battalion Group

Rhodesia 1967–75 

 Name: Rhodesia 1967–75
 S.A. Police (1913–1994)

Gaza 

 Name: Gaza
 SA Field Ambulance, 4th
 SA Field Ambulance, 2nd
 SA Field Ambulance, 1st

Alem el Halfa  

 Name: Alem el Halfa
 Cape Town Highlanders, The Duke of Connaught and Strathearn's Own

Paliano  

 Name: Paliano
 Cape Town Highlanders, The Duke of Connaught and Strathearn's Own

Rome 

 Name: Rome

The Tiber 

 Name: The Tiber

South West Africa/Zambia 1979  

 Name: South West Africa/Zambia 1979
 Kaffrarian Rifle Volunteers

Cuito Cuanaval  

 Name: Cuito Cuanaval
 61 Mechanised Infantry Battalion Group

Mulemba/Mulola  

 Name: Mulemba/Mulola
 61 Mechanised Infantry Battalion Group

Xangongo/Ongiva 

 Name: Xangongo/Ongiva
 61 Mechanised Infantry Battalion Group

Mavinga II  

 Name: Mavinga II
 61 Mechanised Infantry Battalion Group

Mavinga III 

 Name: Mavinga III
 61 Mechanised Infantry Battalion Group

Calueque  

 Name: Calueque
 61 Mechanised Infantry Battalion Group
 8 South African Infantry Battalion

Bangui 

 Name: Bangui
 Description: On 20 February 2014 three units were awarded  battle honours to be displayed on the unit colours for their participation in the Battle of Bangui in the  Central African Republic during March 2013.
 1 Parachute Battalion
 5 Special Forces Regiment 
 7 Medical Battalion

Other 
These are Battle Honours listed by units which are not in the cited source.

El Yibo 

 Name: El Yibo
 Natal Mounted Rifles

Springbok Road 

 Name: Springbok Road
 Natal Mounted Rifles

Bir Temrad 

 Name: Bir Temrad
 Natal Mounted Rifles

Cassinga / Chetequera 

 Name: Cassinga / Chetequera
 3 Parachute Regiment

Messines 1918 

 Name: Messines 1918
 Cape Town Highlanders

Hindenburg Line 

 Name: Hindenburg Line
 Cape Town Highlanders

Cambrai 1918 

 Name: Cambrai 1918
 Cape Town Highlanders

Pursuit to Mons 

 Name: Pursuit to Mons
 Cape Town Highlanders

France and Flanders 1918 

 Name: France and Flanders 1918
 Cape Town Highlanders

Le Transloy 

 Name: Le Transloy
 Cape Town Highlanders

Kemmel 

 Name: Kemmel
 Cape Town Highlanders

Lys 

 Name: Messines 1918
 Cape Town Highlanders

Taieb el Essem 

 Name: Taieb el Essem
 Description: The South African Units formed a component of the 1st Brigade force that held a defensive box south of Sidi Rezegh. On 24-25 November 1941, this force repelled a heavy German armoured assault. 
 Royal Natal Carbineers

Qattara Track 

 Name: Qattara Track
 Description: On 26-27 July 1942 a detachment of the Carbineers was involved in this subsidiary action in the Alamein defensive battles of July 1942. These series of engagements were pivotal in blunting the eastward rush of Field-Marshal Erwin Rommel's Afrika Korps in the wake of the fall of Tobruk in June that year. 
 Royal Natal Carbineers

Bir Sciafsciuf 

 Name: Bir Sciafsciuf
 Description: This minor engagement on 30 November 1941 was another episode in the Crusader offensive. A small Carbineer component was pitted against an enemy convoy in the vicinity of Sidi Rezegh. 
 Royal Natal Carbineers

Wepener 

 Name: Wepener
 Description: 
 Kaffrarian Rifles

Battle Honours by Unit

Cape Town Highlanders

Natal Mounted Rifles

Royal Natal Carbineers

South African Police

Transvaal Scottish Regiment

Cape Town Rifles

General de la Rey Regiment

Notes

References

Bibliography 
 
 
 
 
 
 

Battle Honours
Battle Honours
Battle honours
Pages with Battle Honours